The Sun is an album by Fridge. It was released on 11 June 2007. The vinyl release consists of two records, of which three sides have music, while the fourth side is blank with minimally etched artwork.

Critical reception
Exclaim! wrote that the album "hits several roadblocks, making for an uneven listen full of quick turns, from bedroom layers to warehouse jams." Tiny Mix Tapes declared that "the depth and craft in these songs keep The Sun interesting and make its inspired moments that much better."

Track listing

References 

2007 albums
Fridge (band) albums
Text Records albums